The Brazilian Film Festival of London is a Brazilian-state-sponsored film festival held annually in London. It is in its second edition after first taking place in 2009. The festival is curated by Inffinito, an organization involved with the promotion and diffusion of Brazilian culture.

Programme

The programme involves premiere screenings of a number of Brazilian films at venues across London. The Second Edition (2010) featured films showing at the BAFTA academy, Apollo Piccadilly and the Southbank Centre.

In addition there are a number of talks between high-profile speakers from the Brazilian and UK film industries, with the goal of future collaboration. In 2010, Fernando Meirelles was amongst the speakers.

References

External links
3rd Brazilian Film Festival of London Official site
3rd Brazilian Film Festival of London 6th-10th Sept Full programme for festival with reviews

Film festivals in London
Cinema of Brazil
Film festivals established in 2009
Annual events in London